Rozwój Katowice is a Polish football club located in Katowice, Poland. It currently plays in Polish Second League. The team's primary colors are green, yellow, and black.

Honours
Rozwój Katowice have won the 2011-12 III liga Opolsko-Śląska group (4th Tier).

Current squad
As of 19 December 2018.

Out on loan

External links
 

 
Association football clubs established in 1925
1925 establishments in Poland
Organisations based in Katowice